Timon Gremmels (born January 4, 1976 in Marburg) is a German politician in the Social Democratic Party (SPD) who has been serving as Member of the Bundestag for Kassel, in the German parliament, since 2017.

Education and career
After having received his Abitur diploma from Herderschule in Kassel in 1995, Gremmels studied political science with a minor in law and emphasis on peace & conflict studies at Philipps-Universität Marburg, graduating in 2003. He then worked as a research assistant for Barbara Weiler (SPD), Member of the European Parliament at the time, until 2007. Afterwards, he took the roles of program officer for the regional SPD in Hesse and of advisor to the Social Democratic Association for Local Affairs (Sozial Demokratischen Gemeinschaft für Kommunalpolitik, SGK). In 2008 he moved to the SPD parliamentary group in Hesse as policy advisor on the economy, transportation, energy, regional development, and Europe. Before moving into the Hessian state Parliament in 2009, Gremmels held the corporate social responsibility position on the management board of SMA Solar Technology AG.

Political career

Career in local and state politics
Gremmels joined the SPD in 1992. He became involved with Jusos, the Working Group of Young Socialists in the SPD, and was the president of Jusos Kassel between 1997 and 2001. In 2002, he was subsequently elected deputy chairman of Jusos in North Hesse. From 1999 to 2011 he sat on the board of the SPD group in North Hesse. Furthermore, Gremmels was the president of the committee for education (SPD-Arbeitsgemeinschaft für Bildung) in the district of North Hesse from 2003–2007. Since 2011, he has been a member of the executive committee of the Hessian SPD. In April 2015 he was elected chairman of the local SPD group in Kassel-Land, the Hessian SPD group with the largest number of members.

Gremmels was a Member of the Landtag of Hesse from November 1, 2009 to October 31, 2017. Initially, he acted as a replacement MP for Ulrike Gottschalk. Later, in the 2013 state election he successfully defended the direct mandate of the SPD in Kassel with the state's best first vote result of 47.6%. Most recently, he served as his parliamentary group's spokesman on energy topics and deputy chairman for the Hessian SPD parliamentary group. From 2001 until 2013 Gremmels was a member of the municipal council of his hometown Niestetal and, among other roles, deputy chairman of the local SPD parliamentary group. Since 2001, Gremmels has been a part of Kassel's county council (Landkreis Kassel).

Member of the German Parliament
In November 2016, Gremmels was nominated as SPD candidate for the Kassel constituency. He was elected to the Bundestag in the 2017 general election where he secured 35.5% of the first vote in his constituency. Thus he moved to the 19th Bundestag as a directly elected parliamentarian. 

In parliament, Gremmels serves on the Committee on Economic Affairs and Energy and on the Committee on Petitions. In this capacity, he is his parliamentary group’s rapporteur on efficient energy use.

Other activities

Government agencies
 Federal Network Agency for Electricity, Gas, Telecommunications, Post and Railway (BNetzA), Member of the Advisory Board (since 2022)

Non-profit organizations
 Business Forum of the Social Democratic Party of Germany, Member of the Political Advisory Board (since 2020)
 Europa-Union Deutschland, Member 
 IG Metall, Member
 Workers’ Welfare Association (AWO), Member

See also

 Profile Bundestag
 Website Timon Gremmels
 Timon Gremmels on abgeordnetenwatch.de

References

1976 births
Living people
Members of the Bundestag for Hesse
People from Marburg
University of Marburg alumni
Members of the Bundestag 2021–2025
Members of the Bundestag 2017–2021
Members of the Bundestag for the Social Democratic Party of Germany
LGBT members of the Bundestag
Gay politicians